Youssef Trabelsi (born 18 March 1993) is a Tunisian footballer who plays for Al-Bukiryah as a midfielder.

References

External links
 

1993 births
Living people
Tunisian footballers
Tunisian expatriate footballers
CA Bizertin players
Olympique Béja players
Stade Africain Menzel Bourguiba players
Stade Tunisien players
Bisha FC players
Al-Zulfi FC players
Al-Bukayriyah FC players
Tunisian Ligue Professionnelle 1 players
Saudi Second Division players
Expatriate footballers in Saudi Arabia
Tunisian expatriate sportspeople in Saudi Arabia
Association football midfielders